Pochutla District is located in the east of the Costa Region of the State of Oaxaca, Mexico. The primary city is San Pedro Pochutla.

Municipalities

The district includes the following municipalities:
 
 Candelaria Loxicha 
 Pluma Hidalgo 
 San Agustín Loxicha 
 San Baltazar Loxicha 
 San Bartolomé Loxicha 
 San Mateo Piñas 
 San Miguel del Puerto 
 San Pedro El Alto 
 San Pedro Pochutla 
 Santa Catarina Loxicha 
 Santa María Colotepec 
 Santa María Huatulco 
 Santa María Tonameca 
 Santo Domingo de Morelos

Images of Pochutla District

References

Districts of Oaxaca
Costa Region